Simmias of Rhodes, was a Greek poet and grammarian of the Alexandrian school, which flourished under the early Ptolemies. He was earlier than the tragic poet Philiscus of Corcyra, whose time is about  300 BC, at least if we accept the assertion of Hephaestion (p. 31), that the choriambic hexameter, of which Philiscus claimed the invention, had been previously used by Simmias.

The 10th-century encyclopaedia, the Suda, reports that Simmias wrote three books of Glossai (collections of obscure words) and four books of miscellaneous poems (poiemata diaphora); the latter part of the article in the Suda is obviously misplaced, and belongs to the life of Semonides of Amorgos. Of his grammatical works nothing more is known; but his poems are frequently referred to, and some of them seem to have been, epic. His Gorgo is quoted by Athenaeus (xi. p. 491); his Months and Apollon by Stephanus Byzantinus and a fragment of thirteen lines from the latter poem is preserved by Tzetzes (Chil. vii. 144), and has been edited by Brunck.

As an epigrammatist, Simmias had a place in the Garland of Meleager, and the Greek Anthology contains six epigrams ascribed to him, besides three short poems of that fantastic species called carmina figurata, that is, pieces in which the lines are so arranged as to make the whole poem resemble the form of some object; those of Simmias are entitled, from their forms, the Pteryges (Wings), the Oon (Egg), and the Pelekys (Hatchet).

References

 

Ancient Rhodian grammarians
Ancient Greek poets
Ancient Rhodian poets
Ancient Greek grammarians
Ancient Greek lexicographers
4th-century BC poets
Epigrammatists of the Greek Anthology
4th-century BC Rhodians